Ballyrory may refer to:

Ballyrory, County Londonderry, a village and townland in County Londonderry, Northern Ireland
Ballyrory, County Wexford, a townland in County Wexford, Ireland